Kęstutis Ipolitas Stoškus is a Lithuanian architectural photographer and a museum curator.

Born in Dūdlaukis (Jurbarkas, Lithuania) on March 13, 1951,  Stoškus graduated in economics from the University of Vilnius in 1973. He has worked as a photographer since 1985, and since 1994 has worked for the National Museum of Lithuania.

Stoškus works with medium- and large-format cameras to create detailed black-and-white photographs of the unspoiled parts of the old town of central Vilnius. Cars, advertising, signs of tourism, and even the presence of pedestrians — all are minimized in order not to detract from the architecture, his main interest.

Following Barocke Sakralarchitektur in Wilna (also published in Polish), for which he contributed the photographs, the first book dedicated to Stoškus's work was Vilnius: Photographs of the Old Town, a collection of some thirty images with an introduction by Raminta Jurėnaitė, who describes Stoškus both within a strong tradition of photography of Vilnius and as akin to Eugène Atget and Bernd and Hilla Becher as a systematic creator of documentary architectural work who is yet not commissioned.

Stoškus has had solo exhibitions in Gdańsk (1996, 1998, 2005–06), Valence (1997), Marburg and Leipzig (2002), and Kiel (2003).

Citations

Cited sources and other sources
Stoškus, Kęstutis. Barocke Sakralarchitektur in Wilna: Verfall und Erneuerung. Marburg: Herder-Institut, 2002.  (Text in German.)
Stoškus, Kęstutis. Wileńska architektura doby baroku. Dewastacja i restauracja. Instytut Sztuki PAN, 2005.  (Polish edition of Barocke Sakralarchitektur.)
Stoškus, Kęstutis. Vilnius: Senamiesčio fotografijos / Photographs of the Old Town. Vilnius: E. Karpavičiaus leidykla, 2004.  (Text in Lithuanian and English.)
Pažaislis: menas ir istorija. Vilnius: E. Karpavičiaus leidykla, 2006. . With Eugenijus Karpavičius. On Pažaislis Monastery.

External links
  "Wileńska architektura sakralna doby baroku. Dewastacja i restauracja." About the 2005–6 exhibition in Gdańsk.
  Barocke Sakralarchitektur in Wilna. Verfall und Erneuerung. About the book.
  Agnė Narušytė, "Tarp buvusio ir būsimo Kęstučio Stoškaus fotoparoda Lietuvos nacionaliniame muziejuje."
  "Wileńska orgia barok." About the book.
  "Wileńska architektura sakralna doby baroku" On the exhibition.

1951 births
Architectural photographers
Lithuanian curators
Photographers from Vilnius
Living people
Vilnius University alumni